BookLender (previously Booksfree) is an online book rental company, the first to offer flat rate rental-by-mail to customers in the United States.  Established in 2000 and headquartered in Vienna, Virginia, it boasts an inventory of over 100,000 titles and more than 13,000 subscribers.  On June 8, 2007, the company announced that it had delivered its millionth book.

Corporate history
The company was founded in 2000 by Douglas Ross, who had previously run a computer systems company, and Andrew Bilinski, who had worked for the US Air Force, EDS, and BDM International.  Ross originally come up with the idea for Booksfree in 1999, and after selling his company was looking at what to do next.  US$1 million of start-up funding was provided by friends & associates.  In 2008, Booksfree was recognized by Inc. Magazine as one of America's top 5,000 fastest growing privately held companies.  In February 2009, they shipped their 2 millionth book.  In May 2010, the company launched a complementary online book and audiobook swap service BooksfreeSwap.  The free book swap service was developed in response to customer demand for books and audiobooks that were not available through their rental service.  An audiobook download and streaming service AudiobooksNow was started by Booksfree in January 2012 to meet the growing demand for digital content.  On November 2, 2016, Booksfree rebranded itself as BookLender.  The company felt the name BookLender better represents what the company does.

Business model
The company has been described as "the books version of Netflix", and therefore has a similar business model to online DVD rental companies.  Titles are offered in paperback, CD & MP3 CD audiobook formats.  Separate monthly membership plans are offered for each medium starting at $9.99 for books, $12.99 for MP3-CD audiobooks, and $22.49 for CD & MP3 CD audiobooks.  A combination membership encompassing all media is also available.  Each plan limits the number of items that can be checked out at any one time.  Subscribers can pay a higher monthly fee in order to increase that limit.  It is also possible to rent individual titles without having a membership.

Memberships
Subscriptions to the site have grown from 4,000 in 2002 and 5,000 in 2003 to over 13,000 in 2007.  The vast majority of Bookfree's subscribers are women, and the company has received coverage in many magazines aimed primarily at a female readership such as Woman's Day, First for Woman, and O, The Oprah Magazine.

Competitive environment
The company's founders were quoted in 2002 as considering their main competition to be libraries and online book retailers, noting that each has drawbacks compared with Booksfree.  Comparisons between the services generally focus upon the availability of audiobooks from Booksfree and their decision to not carry hardcover books.

References

Retail companies established in 2000
Internet properties established in 2000
Companies based in Vienna, Virginia
Online retailers of the United States
American book websites
Book rental